Upper San Leandro Reservoir is an artificial lake in Alameda County and Contra Costa County, California which provides water for the East Bay Municipal Utility District (EBMUD). It is impounded by the earth-filled San Leandro Dam on San Leandro Creek, located at the southeast end of the lake. 

Although it receives some runoff from its local watershed, most of the water is imported via the Mokelumne Aqueduct. The reservoir name includes "Upper" to distinguish it from Lake Chabot, several miles downstream, which was originally known as "Lower San Leandro Reservoir".

Original dam
The reservoir was originally formed in 1926 when the first San Leandro Dam was completed, and it was first filled by the Mokelumne Aqueduct in 1929. It inundated a long section of the San Leandro Creek valley, including the towns of Valle Vista and Redwood. The original dam was constructed between 1924 and 1926 using the hydraulic fill method and was considered seismically inadequate.

New dam

A new earth-filled dam was constructed in 1977, directly downstream of the old one, to provide protection against earthquakes.

Tributaries that flow into the lake include San Leandro, Moraga, King Canyon, Kaiser, Buckhorn and Redwood Creeks. The reservoir and its feeder streams have a population of landlocked rainbow trout whose migration to San Francisco Bay was blocked by the dam.

The reservoir is closed to boating and fishing, in order to protect water quality. However, there is a public trail system surrounding the lake.

See also
List of dams and reservoirs in California

References

External links
Upper San Leandro Reservoir, engineering details

Reservoirs in Alameda County, California
Reservoirs in Contra Costa County, California
1926 establishments in California
East Bay Municipal Utility District